The Pakistan Premier League Golden Boot is an annual Pakistani association football award given to the top goalscorer at the end of the Pakistan Premier League season, the top domestic league competition in club Football in Pakistan, since its creation in 2004.

The top-scoring Pakistan Premier League Golden Boot winner is Kaleemullah Khan with 35 goals in a 30-game season with Muhammad Rasool holding the record when the league was a 22-game and 26-game season with 22 goals each and Arif Mehmood holding record when league was a 16-game and 18-game season with 20 goals each season. Mehmood won the award for most number of times with 5 wins, all of them with WAPDA.

Anser Abbas of Pakistan Army is the latest winner of the Golden Boot, his first. During the 2018–19 season, he scored 15 goals in 26 matches.

Recipients
As of the December 2018 six players have won the golden boot award. Only two player has won the award more than once with Mehmood winning the award most times with five wins.

List of Golden Boot winners

The following table is a list of winners of the Pakistan Premier League Golden Boot per season, detailing their club, goal tally, actual games played, and their strike rate (goals/games).

See also
List of Pakistan football champions

References

External links
Official website of Pakistan Premier League

Pakistan Premier League
Pakistani football trophies and awards